Michael Mearls is a writer and designer of fantasy role-playing games (RPGs) and related fiction. He was the senior manager for the Dungeons & Dragons research and design team. He co-led design for the 5th edition of the game. He also worked on the Castle Ravenloft board game, and various compendium books for 3rd, 4th, and 5th editions Dungeons & Dragons.

Education
Mearls is an alumnus of Dartmouth College. While at Dartmouth he was a member of Sigma Nu fraternity, and became known for a satiric letter to the campus paper.

Career
Mearls wrote the adventure To Stand on Hallowed Ground/Swords Against Deception (2001) for Fiery Dragon Productions and the last product from Hogshead Publishing, a Warhammer adventure titled Fear the Worst (2002) that Hogshead released for free on the internet. He also designed the game Iron Heroes (2005) for Malhavoc Press.

In June 2005, Mearls was hired as a designer by Wizards of the Coast; he came to Wizards through the community of third-party d20 designers. At Wizards, he served as a lead developer for Dungeons & Dragons R&D working on the new 4th Edition. Between the "Orcus I" and "Orcus II" design phases for fourth edition, Mearls spliced the encounter-power mechanics of fourth edition into Tome of Battle: The Book of Nine Swords (2006), which was in process during development of the new edition.

Along with Andy Collins, David Noonan, and Jesse Decker, Mearls was part of Rob Heinsoo's "Flywheel" design team for the fourth edition of Dungeons & Dragons, and did the final concept work from May 2006 to September 2006, before the first books for the edition were written and playtested. After Heinsoo was laid off in 2009, Mearls stepped up to become the new D&D Lead Designer. He co-designed the Castle Ravenloft Board Game (2010) with Bill Slavicsek.

In 2014, Mearls was a senior manager for Dungeons & Dragons research and development. Mearls was, together with Jeremy Crawford, Co-Lead Designer for the Fifth Edition of Dungeons & Dragons. By 2018, Mearls had become the franchise's Creative Director. He left the Wizards of the Coast tabletop RPG team in 2019 and was replaced by Ray Winninger as the Executive Producer in charge of the Dungeons & Dragons studio in 2020.

Writing credits
 Iron Heroes role playing game.
 "The Siege of Durgham's Folly," from Necromancer Games
 Dungeons & Dragons 4th Edition Player's Handbook 2
 Dungeons & Dragons 4th Edition Monster Manual 3
 Dungeons & Dragons 4th Edition Keep on the Shadowfell, Adventure Book
 Playtest: New Hybrid and Multiclass Options, Dragon magazine #400
 Dragon magazine #360

References

External links
 

American bloggers
Dartmouth College alumni
Dungeons & Dragons game designers
Living people
Year of birth missing (living people)